Kılıç is a Turkish surname meaning "sword". Notable people with the surname include:

 Ahmet Kilic (born 1984), Dutch footballer of Turkish descent
 Akif Çağatay Kılıç (born 1976), Turkish politician and government minister
 Ali Kılıç (1890–1971), Turkish military officer and politician
 Dündar Kılıç (1935–1999), infamous Turkish mob boss
 Erman Kılıç (born 1983), Turkish professional footballer
 Gökhan Kılıç (born 1988), Turkish weightlifter
 Gündüz Kılıç (1919–1980), Turkish footballer
 Haşim Kılıç (born 1950), Turkish judge
 Lioubov Kılıç (born 1977), Russian female volleyball player
 Ramazan Serkan Kılıç (born 1984), Turkish volleyball player
 Suat Kılıç (born 1972), Turkish lawyer and government minister
 Yakup Kılıç (born 1986), Turkish boxer

Kılınç is another spelling of the word Kılıç. It may refer to:
 David Kilinc (born 1992), Swiss-Italian professional footballer
 Tuncer Kılınç (born 1940), retired Turkish general.

Turkish-language surnames